Indian Telly Award for Best Actor in a Negative Role is an award given by Indiantelevision.com as part of its annual Indian Telly Awards for TV serials, to recognize a male actor who has delivered an outstanding performance in a negative role.

The award was first awarded in 2002. Since 2010, the award has been separated in two categories, Jury Award and Popular Award. Jury award is given by the chosen jury of critics assigned to the function while Popular Award is given on the basis of public voting.

Superlatives

List of winners (Popular)

2000s
2001 Not Awarded
2002 Govind Namdev - Sarhadein as Kedarnath
Rajeev Mehta - Ek Mahal Ho Sapno Ka as Sameer Nanavati
Aasif Sheikh - Mehndi Tere Naam Ki as Raj
Prashant Narayanan - Shagun as Sumer
Rajendranath Zutshi - Bazaar as Subrat
2003 Mohnish Bahl - Devi as Vikram (tied with) Manoj Joshi - Kehta Hai Dil as Mayor Sahab  
Hiten Tejwani - Kyunki Saas Bhi Kabhi Bahu Thi as Karan
Pracheen Chauhan - Kasautii Zindagii Kay as Subroto Basu
Rajeev Paul - Kahaani Ghar Ghar Kii as Deven Garg
Murli Sharma - Virasaat
2004 Shabbir Ahluwalia - Kahiin To Hoga as Rishi
Manoj Joshi - Kehta Hai Dil as Mayor Sahab
Akashdeep Saigal - Kyunki Saas Bhi Kabhi Bahu Thi as Ansh Gujral
Mohnish Bahl - Devi as Vikram
Rituraj Singh - Kahaani Ghar Ghar Kii as Sanjay Doshi
 Vinay Jain - Jassi Jaissi Koi Nahin as Aryan
2005 Akashdeep Saigal - Kyunki Saas Bhi Kabhi Bahu Thi as Ansh Gujral
Shabbir Ahluwalia - Kahiin To Hoga as Rishi 
Rahil Azam - Yeh Meri Life Hai as Ashmit
Alyy Khan - Guns & Roses 
Chetan Hansraj - Kahaani Ghar Ghar Kii as Saasha
2006 Mohnish Bahl - Ek Ladki Anjaani Si as Veer 
Aman Verma - Viraasat as Rishabh Lamba
Vikas Sethi - Kahiin To Hoga as Swayam
Puneet Sachdev - Bhabhi as Vishwa
Karanvir Bohra - Kasautii Zindagii Kay as Prem
2007 Ronit Roy - Kasamh Se as  Aparajit Dev
Akashdeep Saigal - Kyunki Saas Bhi Kabhi Bahu Thi as Eklavya
Aman Verma - Viraasat as Rishabh Lamba
Raqesh Bapat - Saat Phere: Saloni Ka Safar as Neel
Chetan Hansraj - Dharti Ka Veer Yodha Prithviraj Chauhan as Bhimdev
Rajesh Khera - Left Right Left as Major Bhargav
2008 Jatin Shah - Kasturi as Ronak
Satyajit Sharma - Balika Vadhu as Vasant
Chetan Hansraj - Kahaani Ghar Ghar Kii as Saasha
Faisal Raza Khan - Parrivaar as Swapnil
Indraneil Sengupta - Maayka as Tushar
2009 Sudesh Berry - Agle Janam Mohe Bitiya Hi Kijo as Loha Singh
Harsh Chhaya - Ladies Special as Karan
Vikram Gokhale - Jeevan Saathi  as Vikramaditya Rathod
Mahesh Manjrekar - Monica Mogre Case Files as Deep Raj Mathur
Aditya Redij - Na Aana Is Des Laado as Raghav

2010s

2010 Anupam Shyam - Mann Kee Awaaz Pratigya as Thakur Sajjan Singh 
Sudesh Berry - Mata Ki Chowki as Sheel Kumar
Sachal Tyagi - Agle Janam Mohe Bitiya Hi Kijo as Ranvijay
Indresh Malik - 12/24 Karol Bagh as Rajeev Bhalla
Rajendra Gupta - Balika Vadhu as Mahavir Singh
Yashpal Sharma - Mera Naam Karegi Roshan as Kunwar Kuldeep Singh
2011 No Award
2012 Karanvir Bohra - Dil Se Di Dua... Saubhagyavati Bhava? as Viraj Dobriyal
Vikramjeet Virk - Shobha Somnath Ki as Gajnavi
Aman Verma - Na Aana Is Des Laado as Bhanu Pratap 
Abhaas Mehta - Iss Pyaar Ko Kya Naam Doon? as Shyam Jha
Anupam Shyam - Mann Kee Awaaz Pratigya as Thakur Sajjan Singh
2013 Mahesh Shetty - Bade Achhe Lagte Hain as Siddhanth Amarnath Kapoor (Sid) 
Kiran Karmarkar - Uttran as Tej Singh Baldev Singh Bundela 
Abhaas Mehta - Iss Pyaar Ko Kya Naam Doon? as Shyam Jha
Varun Badola - Phir Subah Hogi as Thakur Vikram Singh
Krip Suri - Savitri as Rahu Kaal 
Rajendranath Zutshi - Madhubala - Ek Ishq Ek Junoon as Balraj Choudhary
2014 Praneet Bhat - Mahabharat as Shakuni
Arpit Ranka - Mahabharat as Duryodhana
Manish Wadhwa - Iss Pyaar Ko Kya Naam Doon? Ek Baar Phir as Niranjan Agnihotri
Vishwajeet Pradhan - Ek Boond Ishq as Rudra Pratap Singh
Mohit Malik - Doli Armaano Ki as Samrat Singh Rathore
 2015 Sai Ballal - Udaan as Kamal NarayanAvinesh Rekhi - Bharat Ka Veer Putra Maharana Pratap as Akbar
Aarya Babbar - Sankatmochan Mahabali Hanuman as Raavan
Daya Shankar Pandey - Badi Devrani as Bilasi
Harsh Chhaya - Ajeeb Dastaan Hai Ye as Samrat2016Not Awarded2017Not Awarded2018Not Awarded2019 Rajesh Khattar - Bepannah as Harshvardhan HoodaSanjay Gagnani - Kundali Bhagya as Prithvi Malhotra
Abhinav Shukla - Silsila Badalte Rishton Ka as Rajdeep Thakur
Rajat Tokas - Naagin 3 as Vikrant
 Rushiraj Pawar - RadhaKrishn as Ayan
Saurabh Raj Jain - Chandragupta Maurya (2018) as Mahapadma Nanda
Rahil Azam - Tu Aashiqui as Jayant Dhanrajgir
 Sanjay Swaraj - Kasautii Zindagii Kay (2018) as Naveen Babu
Nikitin Dheer - Naagin 3 as Hukum
Ankit Mohan - Naagin 3 as Yuvraj Sehgal

 Jury Award 

 2010s2010 Yashpal Sharma - Mera Naam Karegi Roshan as Kunwar Kuldeep Singh 2011 No Award2012 Anupam Shyam - Mann Kee Awaaz Pratigya as Thakur Sajjan Singh 
Sushant Singh - Zindgi Ka Har Rang ... Gulaal as Dushyant
Vishwajeet Pradhan - Maryada: Lekin Kab Tak? as Brahmanand Jhaakar
Sumit Arora - Pavitra Rishta as Dharmesh Jaipurwala
Sooraj Thapar - Chandragupt Maurya as Dhanananda2013 Kiran Karmarkar - Uttran as Tej Singh Baldev Singh Bundela 
 Anupam Shyam - Mann Kee Awaaz Pratigya as Sajjan Singh 	
Varun Badola - Phir Subah Hogi as Vikram Singh 
Mithil Jain - Junoon - Aisi Nafrat Toh Kaisa Ishq as Lakhan Singh
Mahesh Shetty - Bade Achhe Lagte Hain as Siddhanth Amarnath Kapoor (Sid)2014 Kishor Kadam - 24 (Indian TV series) as RavinderAjinkya Deo - 24 (Indian TV series) as Kartik Chandrashekhar
Rahul Singh - 24 (Indian TV series) as Vikrant Maurya 
Pradip Kabra - Bharat Ka Veer Putra – Maharana Pratap  as Shams Khan 
Vishwajeet Pradhan - Ek Boond Ishq as Rudra Pratap Singh / Kalavati2019 Mukul Dev - 21 Sarfarosh - Saragarhi 1897 as Gul Badshah'''

References

Indian Telly Awards